Constantin Romanovich Bakaleinikov (also spelled Bakaleynikov and Bakaleinikoff; ; 26 April 1896 – 3 September 1966) was a Russian-born composer who worked in Hollywood, California.

Life and career
Bakaleinikoff was from a large musical family.  His brothers were Nikolai Bakaleinikov (flautist, composer and conductor), Vladimir Bakaleinikov (violist, composer and conductor), and Mikhail (Mischa) Bakaleinikoff (composer). He studied at the Moscow Conservatory.  Following the Russian revolution he migrated to the United States of America  with his brother Mischa. Constantin Bakaleinikoff (pronounced back-a-LAIN-a-koff) worked as a conductor for the Los Angeles Philharmonic before beginning his Hollywood career as a freelance composer. At the 1927 premiere of Director Cecil B. DeMille's The King of Kings  at Hollywood's famed Grauman's Chinese Theater, which was hosted by D.W. Griffith and speakers DeMille and Mary Pickford, the audience was treated to a concert of film music "classics" conducted by Constantin Bakaleinikoff.

With the arrival of sound, the Bakaleinikoff brothers became studio maestros. Mischa joined Columbia Pictures, while Constantin became a musical director at Paramount Pictures, followed by MGM. Constantin also worked briefly at Columbia, and later for independent Grand National Pictures.

In 1935, Bakaleinikoff participated in making the earliest dance film, Spring Night. He conducted Joseph Achron's score for this first experimental ballet film, which featured the choreography and dancing of David Lichine, who had danced with Colonel de Basil's Ballet Russe de Monte Carlo. Nana Gollner, the Texas-born ballerina, was his partner. This pioneering film, which emerged from the Diaghilev sphere of influence, was produced by Adolf Zuckor. The camera work was by George Clemens, who went on to do the cinematography for the Twilight Zone and other popular television shows.

He received his first Academy Award nomination for scoring the James Cagney feature, Something to Sing About.

Later, Bakaleinikoff  became the senior music director at RKO Radio Pictures, where he spent most of his motion picture career. He earned Academy Award nominations for his work on The Fallen Sparrow, Higher and Higher, and None But the Lonely Heart. For Alfred Hitchcock's Notorious (1946), starring Cary Grant and Ingrid Bergman, he conducted the original score by composer Roy Webb, one that complements the director's elements of suspense and danger throughout the film.

Constantin Bakaleinikoff, who was always billed as "C. Bakaleinikoff," appeared on camera as himself in RKO's backstage musical Ding Dong Williams (filmed 1945, released in April 1946).

He remained at RKO until the studio folded in 1956. He was married to silent film actress Fritzi Ridgeway.

He donated his time and talent in the late 1950s in mentoring and conducting the Burbank Youth Symphony.

He is buried at Forest Lawn Memorial Park (Glendale).

Soundtracks
 Spring Night (1935) David Lichine, Nana Gollner
 Something to Sing About (1936) Grand National Pictures
 James Cagney
 The Story of Vernon and Irene Castle (1939) RKO Radio Pictures
 Fred Astaire, Ginger Rogers
 The Big Street  (1942) RKO
 Henry Fonda, Lucille Ball
 Stage Door Canteen  (1943) RKO
 All-star cast
 Tarzan's Desert Mystery  (1943) RKO
 Johnny Weissmuller, Nancy Kelly, Johnny Sheffield
 Higher and Higher (1943) RKO
 "I Couldn't Sleep a Wink Last Night" - Frank Sinatra, Stanley Wrightsman (Piano), The RKO Radio Studio Orchestra, Constantin Bakaleinikoff
 "The Music Stopped" - Frank Sinatra, The RKO Radio Studio Orchestra, Constantin Bakaleinikoff
 "I Saw You First" - Frank Sinatra, Marcy McGuire, The RKO Radio Studio Orchestra, Constantin Bakaleinikoff
 "A Lovely Way to Spend an Evening" (With Orchestra) - Frank Sinatra, The RKO Radio Studio Orchestra, Constantin Bakaleinikoff
 "A Lovely Way to Spend an Evening" (Piano & Vocal) - Frank Sinatra, Stanley Wrightsman (Piano)
 "You're on Your Own" - Frank Sinatra, Dooley Wilson, Mel Tormé, Marcy McGuire, Michèle Morgan, Victor Borge, Cast, The RKO Radio Studio Orchestra, Constantin Bakaleinikoff
 "You're on Your Own" (Reprise) - Frank Sinatra, The RKO Radio Studio Orchestra, Constantin Bakaleinikoff
 "Finale: I Saw You First/A Lovely Way To Spend An Evening/The Music Stopped" - Frank Sinatra, Marcy McGuire, Barbara Hale, Chorus, The RKO Radio Studio Orchestra, Constantin Bakaleinikoff
 Step Lively (1944) RKO
 "Come Out, Come Out, Wherever You Are" - Frank Sinatra, Gloria DeHaven, Chorus, The RKO Radio Studio Orchestra, Constantin Bakaleinikoff
 "As Long as There's Music" - Frank Sinatra, The RKO Radio Studio Orchestra, Constantin Bakaleinikoff
 "Where Does Love Begin?" - Frank Sinatra, Anne Jeffreys, The RKO Radio Studio Orchestra, Constantin Bakaleinikoff
 "Some Other Time" - Frank Sinatra, The RKO Radio Studio Orchestra, Constantin Bakaleinikoff
 "Some Other Time" (Duet Version) - Frank Sinatra, Gloria DeHaven, The RKO Radio Studio Orchestra, Constantin Bakaleinikoff
 "And Then You Kissed Me" (Outtake) - Frank Sinatra, The RKO Radio Studio Orchestra, Constantin Bakaleinikoff
 "Finale: As Long as There's Music/Some Other Time/As Long As There's Music/Where Does Love Begin?" - Frank Sinatra, Gloria DeHaven, George Murphy, Chorus, RKO Radio Studio Orchestrra, C. Bakaleinikoff
 Tall in the Saddle  (1944) RKO
 John Wayne
 Show Business  (1944) RKO
 Eddie Cantor, Joan Davis, Nancy Kelly, Constance Moore, George Murphy
 Murder, My Sweet  (1944) RKO
 Dick Powell, Claire Trevor
 Back to Bataan  (1945) RKO
 John Wayne, Anthony Quinn
 Dick Tracy vs. Cueball  (1946) RKO
 Morgan Conway, Anne Jeffreys
 The Spiral Staircase  (1946) RKO
 Dorothy McGuire, Ethel Barrymore, Rhonda Fleming
 Notorious  (1946) RKO
 Cary Grant, Ingrid Bergman
 Ding Dong Williams  (1946) RKO
 "Piano Concerto in A Minor, Opus 16" - Played by the RKO studio orchestra conducted by C. Bakaleinikoff with prodigy Richard Korbel at the piano
 Born to Kill  (1947) RKO
 Lawrence Tierney, Claire Trevor
 Out of the Past  (1947) RKO
 Robert Mitchum, Jane Greer
 Mourning Becomes Electra  (1947) RKO
 Rosalind Russell, Michael Redgrave
 The Bachelor and the Bobby-Soxer  (1947) RKO
 Cary Grant, Myrna Loy, Shirley Temple
 Tycoon  (1947) RKO
 John Wayne, Laraine Day
 Crossfire  (1947) RKO
 Robert Young, Robert Mitchum
 I Remember Mama  (1948) RKO
 Irene Dunne
 Mr. Blandings Builds His Dream House  (1948) RKO
 Cary Grant, Myrna Loy
 The Boy with Green Hair  (1948) RKO
 Pat O'Brien, Robert Ryan, Barbara Hale, Dean Stockwell
 The Man on the Eiffel Tower (1949)RKO
 Charles Laughton, Burgess Meredith
 The Set Up  (1949) RKO
 Robert Ryan
 Mighty Joe Young  (1949) RKO
 Terry Moore, Ben Johnson
 She Wore a Yellow Ribbon (1949) RKO
 John Wayne
 Flying Leathernecks (1951) RKO
 John Wayne
 Double Dynamite (1951) RKO
 "It's Only Money" - Frank Sinatra, Groucho Marx, The RKO Radio Studio Orchestra, Constantin Bakaleinikoff
 "Kisses And Tears" - Frank Sinatra, Jane Russell, The RKO Radio Studio Orchestra, Constantin Bakaleinikoff
 "Finale: It's Only Money" - Frank Sinatra, Groucho Marx, Jane Russell, The RKO Radio Studio Orchestra, Constantin Bakaleinikoff
 Macao  (1952) RKO
 Robert Mitchum, Jane Russell
 Clash by Night  (1952) RKO
 Barbara Stanwyck, Robert Ryan, Marilyn Monroe
 The Hitch-Hiker  (1953) RKO
 Edmond O'Brien, Frank Lovejoy
 Susan Slept Here  (1954) RKO
 Dick Powell, Debbie Reynolds
 The Conqueror  (1956) RKO
 John Wayne, Susan Hayward
 The Bachelor Party  (1957) United Artists
 Carolyn Jones, Don Murray, E.G. Marshall, Jack Warden
 St. Louis Blues  (1958) Paramount
 "Saint Louis Blues" - Performed by Nat 'King' Cole and Pearl Bailey
Later sung by Eartha Kitt, then Nat 'King' Cole, with orchestra conducted on-screen by C. Bakaleinikoff

References

External links
 Allmovie bio
 
 Composers Lyricists Database
 Artist Direct Film Soundtracks
 

1896 births
1966 deaths
American film score composers
American male film score composers
American male conductors (music)
People who emigrated to escape Bolshevism
White Russian emigrants to the United States
Conductors (music) from the Russian Empire
Russian male conductors (music)
Composers from the Russian Empire
Moscow Conservatory alumni
Burials at Forest Lawn Memorial Park (Glendale)
20th-century American conductors (music)
20th-century American composers
20th-century American male musicians